Guangchang County lies in the municipal region of Fuzhou (抚州), Jiangxi. It is the southernmost and most remote of Fuzhou's ten counties, being bordered by counties in Ganzhou to the south and west and, to the east and over the watershed and provincial border, by Jianning and Ninghua Counties, Sanming, Fujian. It is the source of the second largest river in Jiangxi: Fuhe (抚河). This county built in the Southern Song Dynasty Shaoxing eight years (1138, Shaoxing is an era name of Gaozong), because the rich white lotus, known as "the hometown of Chinese White Lotus."

Administration
In the present, Guangchang County has 5 towns and 6 townships.

5 Towns (镇, zhen)

6 Townships (乡, xiang)

Climate

References

County-level divisions of Jiangxi
Fuzhou, Jiangxi